Leonardo Nelson Price (born February 21, 1979 in Trelew) is an Argentine middle distance runner. He is a three-time national champion for the 800 metres, and two-time for the 1500 metres.

Price represented Argentina at the 2008 Summer Olympics in Beijing, where he competed for the men's 800 metres. He ran in the second heat against six other competitors, including Sudan's Abubaker Kaki, who was a heavy favorite and a possible top medal contender in this event. He finished the race in sixth place by three fourths of a second (0.75) behind Slovakia's Jozef Repcìk, with a time of 1:49.39. Price, however, failed to advance into the semi-finals, as he placed fifty-first overall and was ranked farther below two mandatory slots for the next round.

Competition record

References

External links

NBC Olympics Profile

1979 births
Living people
Argentine male middle-distance runners
Olympic athletes of Argentina
Athletes (track and field) at the 2008 Summer Olympics
People from Trelew